Ambia colonalis is a moth in the family Crambidae. It was described by Otto Vasilievich Bremer in 1864. It is found in Japan, Taiwan, the Russian Far East (Amur) and the western Himalayas.

References

Moths described in 1864
Musotiminae
Moths of Asia